Kwame Asafu-Adjei is a Ghanaian politician and member of the Seventh Parliament of the Fourth Republic of Ghana, representing the Nsuta-Kwamang-Beposo Constituency in the Ashanti Region on the ticket of the New Patriotic Party.

Early life and education 
Adjei was born on 10 October 1950 in a town called Nsuta in the Ashanti Region. He acquired a Master of Science degree in Agricultural Economics from Tennessee State University, Nashville, USA in 1980.

Career 
He worked as the chief executive officer of Asafaco Consult Company Limited in Accra. He was the Deputy Director of Policy, Planning, Monitoring & Evaluation (PPME) and the Head of the Livestock Planning Committee at MOFA.

Political career 
He was elected into the sixth parliament of the 4th republic of Ghana on 7 January 2013 after he contested in the 2012 Ghanaian General Elections. He was then reelected into the seventh parliament of the fourth republic of Ghana on 7 January 2017 after obtaining 51.03% of the valid votes cast at the 2016 Ghanaian General Elections. He is a former Member of Parliament for Nsuta-Kwamang-Beposo Constituency.

In 2017, he was the acting chairman of the Food, Agriculture and Cocoa Affairs.

Personal life 
He is a Christian and married with three children.

References

Ghanaian MPs 2017–2021
1950 births
Living people
New Patriotic Party politicians
Tennessee State University alumni
Ghanaian MPs 2013–2017
People from Ashanti Region